Vladislav Yuryevich Kryuchkov (born 24 August 1989) is a Russian professional footballer.

Club career
He played 7 seasons in the Russian Football National League for FC Baltika Kaliningrad and FC SKA-Khabarovsk.

External links
 

1989 births
Sportspeople from Kaliningrad
Living people
Russian footballers
Russia youth international footballers
Association football defenders
FK Ventspils players
FC Baltika Kaliningrad players
FC SKA-Khabarovsk players
Latvian Higher League players
Russian First League players
Armenian Premier League players
Russian Second League players
Russian expatriate footballers
Expatriate footballers in Latvia
Expatriate footballers in Armenia
Russian expatriate sportspeople in Latvia
Russian expatriate sportspeople in Armenia